was a semi-automatic pistol developed starting in 1941 for use by the Empire of Japan during World War II. Developed by Bunji Hamada, the pistol took its basic design from the Model 1910 Browning. Production occurred at the Japanese Firearms Manufacturing Company, with only minor changes made as the war progressed.

Eight production design periods occurred during the production of the pistol with all changes being made during late 1942 and early 1943.  Production records were destroyed during World War II with few known Hamada Type pistols in existence today. Production of the Hamada type ended in February 1944.

History
Importation of foreign sidearms ceased in Japan in 1941, increasing the need for domestic production, and fully nationalizing all raw materials available for gun manufacturing. Unable to continue production of hunting guns, Bunji Hamada founded  and began production of the Hamada type pistol. Initially, the Hamada Type I was designed as an inexpensive and more reliable alternative to the standard issue Nambu pistol, which had a bad reputation among the Japanese military. The pistol was designed as a copy of the Browning Model 1910 and chambered for the 7.65mm Browning, as small caliber American and European pistols were popular among Japanese officers. Around five prototypes for the Hamada pistol were tested by the Chief of the Ordnance Bureau before approval for adoption was made in 1941.

The majority of Hamada pistols were sent with the Imperial Japanese Army to China with a few units transferred to the South Pacific. All production records were destroyed during World War II by bombing raids on Japan. It is estimated that between 4,500 and 5,000 pistols were manufactured before production ended in February 1944.

Design
The Hamada pistol is a blowback pistol and functionally a copy of the Browning Model 1910. The most significant design difference between the Hamada pistol and Browning Model 1910 is the replacement of the interrupter lugs used to hold the barrel of the Browning Model 1910 with a dovetail joint. The frame plate lock design and striker assembly were also modified and awarded patents in 1943. The Hamada pistol maintained high quality throughout its production, with the bluing done to a high standard. The safety, rear frame plate, and extractor were heat tempered to a reddish brown and the barrel, striker, and firing mechanism were brightly polished.

Variations
Eight variations of known Hamada pistols exist with slight differences between them with all known pistols containing serial numbers between 2,214 and 2,959. The narrowness of the range may be attributed to the small number of pistol assigned to the Pacific Theater, where U.S. soldiers collected souvenirs.  The number of serration made on the rear slide increased from six to seven between variation one and two, being reduced back to six serrations with variation three. The grip made of walnut and had a checked pattern with the border design, and lanyard loop being simplified between pistol variation three and four. The serial on the grip of the pistol was enlarged between variation four and five. The slide identification markings were discontinued between variation five and six with the slide muzzle crown being simplified between models six and seven. The disassembly arrows stamped on the slide and frame that, when aligned, allowed the slide to be removed were adjusted to indicate a slight change in design.

Holster
Holsters supplied with the Hamada type pistol were usually made of cowhide leather and contained black metal closure fasteners. Because the Hamada pistol has a long, nine cartridge magazine, the holster of similar weapons like the Browning Model 1910 will not properly contain the Hamada pistol.

Notes

References

External links
 
 

.32 ACP semi-automatic pistols
8×22mm Nambu firearms
Early semi-automatic pistols 
Semi-automatic pistols of Japan
Short recoil firearms
World War II infantry weapons of Japan
Weapons and ammunition introduced in 1941